The  is a large proposed redevelopment project in Nishi-Shinjuku, Tokyo, Japan. The proposal includes a 77-story office tower, two 66-floor and one 50 floor residential towers. The 77-story office tower, called East Office Tower (東オフィス棟), is set to rise  and become Japan's tallest building, taking the title away from the Abeno Harukas in Osaka. Two identical 66-floor residential towers, called North Residential Tower (北住宅棟) and South Residential Tower (南住宅棟) will rise . The third and shortest residential building, West Residential Tower (西住宅棟), will rise  and contain 50 residential floors. The entire complex was slated for completion in 2010, but as of 2010, plans for the complex were still on hold for unannounced reasons.

See also
 List of tallest buildings in Tokyo

References

Proposed skyscrapers in Japan
Skyscrapers in Shinjuku